The second election to Ceredigion District Council was held in May 1976.  It was preceded by the 1973 election and followed by the 1979 election. On the same day there were elections to the other district and community councils in Wales.

Results

Aberaeron (one seat)

Aberbanc (one seat)

Aberporth (one seat)

Aberystwyth Ward One (four seats)

Aberystwyth Ward Two (two seats)

Aberystwyth Ward Three (two seats)

Aeron (one seat)

Borth (one seat)

Bow Street (one seat)

Cardigan (three seats)

Cwmrheidol and Devils' Bridge (one seat)

Faenor Upper (one seat)

Felinfach (one seat)

Lampeter (two seats)

Llanarth (one seat)

Llanbadarn Fawr (one seat)

Llandygwydd (one seat)

Llandysul North (one seat)

Llandysul South (one seat)

Llanfair and Llanwnen (one seat)

Llanfarian (one seat)
This ward was also known as Llanychaiarn.

Llanfihangel and Llanilar (one seat)

Llangeitho and Caron Isclawdd (one seat)

Llangoedmor (one seat)

Llangrannog and Penbryn (one seat)

Llanilar and Llanrhystud (one seat)
This ward was also known as Llanddeiniol.

Llanllwchaiarn and Llandysiliogogo (one seat)

Llansantffraid and Cilcennin (one seat)

Llanwenog (one seat)

Lledrod, Strata Florida and Ysbyty Ystwyth (one seat)

Nantcwnlle, Llanddewi Brefi and Llangeitho (one seat)

New Quay (one seat)

Taliesin and Talybont (one seat)

Trefeurig and Goginan (one seat)

Troedyraur (one seat)

References

1976
1976 Welsh local elections
20th century in Ceredigion
May 1976 events in the United Kingdom